The Hsiuping University of Science and Technology (HUST) is a private university in Dali District, Taichung, Taiwan.

HUST offers a wide range of academic programs, including undergraduate and graduate degrees in Engineering, Business, Humanities, Social Sciences, and Health Sciences. 

The university has eight colleges, including the College of Engineering, the College of Management, the College of Humanities and Social Sciences, and the College of Health Sciences.

History
HUST was originally established as Shu-Teh Junior College of Home Economics in 1965. In 1970, it was renamed to Shu-Teh Junior College of Technology. In 1994, it was again renamed to Shu-Teh Junior College of Technology and Commerce. In 2000, the ROC Minister of Education finally recognized the college as Hsiuping Institute of Technology and finally as Hsiuping University of Science and Technology in 2011.

Faculties
 College of Engineering
 College of Humanities and Creativity
 College of Management
 International College

See also
 List of universities in Taiwan

References

External links

 

1965 establishments in Taiwan
Educational institutions established in 1965
Universities and colleges in Taichung
Universities and colleges in Taiwan
Technical universities and colleges in Taiwan